The Heureux was a Centaure class 74-gun ship of the line of the French Navy.

She cruised in the Mediterranean in 1794 and 1795.

Under Captain Jean-Pierre Etienne, she took part in the Expedition to Egypt, and in the Battle of the Nile. The first ship to spot the British fleet on 1 August, Heureux fought the next day and was forced to strike her colours. Too badly damaged for repairs, she was burnt on 29 August 1798.

Notes

References

Demerliac, Cmdt. Alain, Nomenclature des navires français de 1774 a 1792.  Editions ANCRE, Nice.
Winfield, Rif and Roberts, Stephen (2015) French Warships in the Age of Sail 1786-1861: Design, Construction, Careers and Fates. Seaforth Publishing. .

Ships of the line of the French Navy
Centaure-class ships of the line
1782 ships
Ships built in France
Maritime incidents in 1798
Ship fires
Scuttled vessels
Shipwrecks of Egypt
Shipwrecks in the Mediterranean Sea